Kendriya Vidyalaya No. 2, Nausena Baugh, Vizag is a Co-educational school run by the KV Sangathan. It is located in the Southern Part of the city of Visakhapatnam, on the foothill of the Dolphin's Nose, Nausenabaugh. The school has three well maintained computer labs. It is a CBSE affiliated school. This is one of the three Kendriya Vidyalayas and one Navy Children School in the Naval Campus. The other three being KV1, NSB; KV Malkapuram; NCS, NSB, Vizag.

Building
The school has a fairly big campus with a rectangular building which is two-storeyed. School has a large grassless playground where all sport activities are held. The school is set up in a serene quiet ambiance and away from the city cacophony and traffic noises. A solid-floored quadrangle is in the middle of the rectangular structure. A stage in the middle divides the building into Primary and Secondary Sections.

Labs
The school has 3 computer labs. One lab is solely dedicated for the usage of primary section (classes from I to V). The other two being utilised by Junior (VI - IX) and Senior (X - XII) Secondary Sections.

See also
 List of Kendriya Vidyalayas

References

External links 
 Kendriya Vidyalaya Sangathan

Kendriya Vidyalayas
Government schools in India
Co-educational schools in India
Educational institutions in India with year of establishment missing